Ötesiz Ìnsanlar (English: The Desperate People) is a Turkish television drama series that originally aired on Samanyolu TV from November 21, 2013, to June 15, 2015.

Plot
Elif (Ergül Miray Şahin), an idealistic eighteen-year-old girl living in a village, aspires to become a doctor and study at the Istanbul University. With the help of Deniz Aydin, a good-hearted soldier who was on duty in her village at the time, helps her escape with him from her father who wanted to marry her to a man in exchange of money. Deniz immediately falls in love with Elif's pure and strong character. Elif while in Istanbul soon finds out she has to take off her hijab to study in the university.

Deniz continuously looks out for Elif and helps her in every way possible. Elif, initially denying, eventually confesses her love for Deniz. Deniz's wealthy family opposes the hijab-wearing tradition, similar to other Turkish people, and the family immediately despises Elif at first sight.

Against his will, Deniz is engaged to another woman, Sanam. She does everything possible to make Elif's life miserable because she is aware that Deniz only loves Elif.

Elif encounters numerous social prejudices but never gives up. She perseveres in her job and completes her education while refusing to give up on her hijab and her religion.

Cast
 Ergül Miray Şahin as Elif
 Batuhan Aydar as Teğmen(Lieutenant) Deniz Aydın
 İlker Hüseyin Köroğlu as Albay(Colonel) later Tuğgeneral(Brigadier General) Sancar Canlıca
 Naşit Özcan as Korgeneral(Lieutenant General) Kudret Karay
 Sevinç Gürşen Ayyıldız as Rana Karay
 Yıldırım Gücük as Yılmaz
 Sibel Seyhan as İnci
 Aytunç Özulus as Durali
 Mustafa Onur Akpınar as Ziya
 Derya Taşbaşı as Sinem
 Yasemin Öztürk as Şenay Aydın
 Şensel Uykal as Adile Teyze
 Selçuk Soğukçay] as Sabri Komutan
 Reyhan Nur Çalıkoğlu as Serap
 Mert Temizce as Erdem
 Canan Çiftel as Rana
 Hakverdi Biber as Binbaşı(Major) Şahin
 Dalya Kilimci as Filiz
 Özge Küçükoğlu as Süheyla
 Belma Mamati as Kumru
 Nazlı Yanılmaz as Sanem Karay
 Asuman Çakır as Kadriye

International broadcasters

See also
 Television in Turkey
 List of Turkish television series
 Turkish television drama

References

External links 

 
 Otesiz insanlar Sinemalar.com
 Otesiz insanlar BeyazPerde.com

2013 Turkish television series debuts
2015 Turkish television series endings
Turkish drama television series
Samanyolu TV
Television series produced in Istanbul
Television shows set in Istanbul
Television series set in the 2010s